Finland was represented by Viktor Klimenko, with the song "Aurinko laskee länteen", at the 1965 Eurovision Song Contest, which took place on 20 March in Naples.

Before Eurovision
The Finnish national selection composed of a semi final and a final.

Semi final
Ten songs were chosen to the national semi final. Those songs were played on radio in late January and six finalists were chosen by postcard voting.

National final
The Finnish national final took place on February 13 at the YLE TV Studios in Helsinki. The show was hosted by Antti Einiö and Marion Rung. There were two juries, regional juries and a Nordic jury. Should both juries have the same favourite, it would be declared the winner. However, the favorite song of regional juries was "Iltaisin" performed by Marjatta Leppänen and of Nordic jury was "Aurinko laskee länteen" by Viktor Klimenko. Therefore the winner was chosen by Yle's administration and they chose "Aurinko laskee länteen".

''Note. The points are total points awarded by regional juries and the Nordic jury. The Finnish representative was eventually chosen by Yle's administration.

At Eurovision
On the night of the final Viktor Klimenko performed 16th in the running order, following Luxembourg and preceding Yugoslavia. The Finnish entry was conducted by George de Godzinsky. Finland did not receive any points in the voting and therefore placed joint last with Spain, Germany and Belgium.

Voting 
Finland did not receive any points at the 1965 Eurovision Song Contest.

Sources
Viisukuppila, Muistathan: Suomen karsinnat 1965 
Finnish national final 1965 on natfinals

1965
Countries in the Eurovision Song Contest 1965
Eurovision